Alberta Provincial Highway No. 28, commonly referred to as Highway 28, is a highway in north-central Alberta, Canada that connects Edmonton to Cold Lake.  It begins at Yellowhead Trail (Highway 16) in Edmonton as 97 Street NW, running through the city's north suburbs before entering Sturgeon County and passing CFB Edmonton.  After merging with Highway 28A near Gibbons it winds through agricultural lands of north-central Alberta, roughly paralleling the North Saskatchewan River until Smoky Lake before continuing east through St. Paul County to Bonnyville.  It turns northeast to CFB Cold Lake, before ending at Lakeshore Drive in the city of Cold Lake shortly thereafter.

The highway is a component of Canada's National Highway System.  Between Highway 28A near Gibbons and the intersection with Highway 63 near Radway, it forms part of the Edmonton-Fort McMurray corridor and is designated as a core route.  For the remainder of the route from Radway to the eastern end at Cold Lake, it is designated as a feeder route.

History 
Highway 28 was built in 1961, connecting Alberta's Lakeland to Edmonton by gravel road for the first time. Construction of the highway required splitting Mann Lake in two, creating Upper Mann Lake and Lower Mann Lake.

Prior to 2006, Highway 28 ran through St. Paul. A  section of the current highway between Ashmont and Hoselaw was formerly designated as Highway 28A, a bypass of St. Paul.  As part of an effort to simplify highway route numbering in the region, this section was re-signed as Highway 28 in 2006 forming a more contiguous route between Edmonton and Cold Lake, while Highway 28 through St. Paul was re-signed as Highway 29.

Highway 28X 
Alberta Provincial Highway No. 28X, commonly referred to as Highway 28X, was a  spur route of Highway 28. In , Highway 28X was part of a number of highways which were renumbered when Alberta Highway 55 was established between Athabasca and the Saskatchewan border.

Future 
Alberta Transportation ultimately intends to upgrade the entire Edmonton-Fort McMurray corridor to a divided highway, which would include twinning of Highway 28 from Highway 28A to Highway 63.

Major intersections 
Starting from the west end of Highway 28:

References 

028
Cold Lake, Alberta
Roads in Edmonton